So-tteok so-tteok ("sausage + rice cakes") is a popular South Korean street food consisting of skewered and fried garae-tteok (rice cakes) and vienna sausage brushed with several sauce include mustard and spicy gochujang-based sauce.

References

Skewered foods
Street food in South Korea
South Korean cuisine
South Korean meat dishes
Korean sausages
Sausage dishes
Tteok
Bunsik